Bert Reid may refer to:

Bert Reid (rugby union), see List of South Africa national rugby union players
Bert Reid (musician), member of Raw Silk and Crown Heights Affair

See also
Bert Read (fl. 1895–1908), English footballer
Bertie Reed (1943–2006), South African solo yachtsman
Bert Reed (born 1988), American football player
Bert Fraser-Reid (born 1934), Jamaican organic chemist
Albert Reid (disambiguation)
Albert Read (disambiguation)
Albert Reed (disambiguation)
Robert Reid (disambiguation)
Robert Reed (disambiguation)
Herbert Reed (disambiguation)
Hubert Reed (disambiguation)